Pudukadai is a panchayat town in Kanniyakumari district in the Indian state of Tamil Nadu.

Demographics
 India census, Pudukadai had a population of 9012. Males constitute 51% of the population and females 49%. Pudukadai has an average literacy rate of 78%, higher than the national average of 59.5%: male literacy is 82%, and female literacy is 74%. In Pudukadai, 11% of the population is under 6 years of age.

References

Cities and towns in Kanyakumari district